On Yam Estate is a public housing estate in North Kwai Chung, New Territories, Hong Kong. It is situated on land which was formerly the location of Shek Yam Temporary Housing Area and Shek Lei Temporary Housing Area. The estate consists of 8 residential buildings (in Phase 1 and 2) completed in 1994 and 1995.

Houses

Demographics
According to the 2016 by-census, On Yam Estate had a population of 15,736. The median age was 46.9 and the majority of residents (96 per cent) were of Chinese ethnicity. The average household size was 3.1 people. The median monthly household income of all households (i.e. including both economically active and inactive households) was HK$26,000.

Politics
On Yam Estate is located in On Yam constituency of the Kwai Tsing District Council. It was formerly represented by Leung Wing-kuen, who was elected in the 2019 elections until July 2021.

See also

Public housing estates in Kwai Chung

References

Residential buildings completed in 1994
Residential buildings completed in 1995
Kwai Chung
Public housing estates in Hong Kong